Muhammad Hussain Sadiqi Nili was one of the jihadist leaders in Afghanistan.

Early life 
Muhammad Hussain Sadiqi Nili, was born on 1940, in a family of Hazara, in the Nili village of Daykundi. He learned elementary religious knowledge in his hometown, in Nili. Later, in 1970, he went to Najaf, Iraq for advanced religious studies.

He is the father of Nasrullah Sadiqi Zada Nili.

Death 
On 15 November 1990, in Nili some of his enemies who were members of the Islamic Movement of Afghanistan shot him in his house through the window. In this attack, he and his three-year-old son are killed.

See also 
 List of Hazara people
 Nasrullah Sadiqi Zada Nili

Notes 

1990 deaths
1940 births
Hazara politicians
Hezbe Wahdat politicians
People from Daykundi Province